Yorkshire Coast Radio was a local radio station serving Scarborough, Whitby & Bridlington. The station was folded into Greatest Hits Radio Yorkshire, as part of a rebrand, on 1 September 2020.

History

For many years, several businessmen in Scarborough had campaigned for their own local radio station. A licence was advertised in 1991 and contested by three groups. The winning consortium, Yorkshire Coast Radio Limited, was founded by radio executive and former presenter Paul Rusling with backing from former Conservative MP Wilf Proudfoot, who served as managing director for short-lived pirate station Radio 270, which was based in the town. After the franchise was awarded, YCR was bought out by Minster Sound plc – the owners of neighbouring York-based station Minster FM, which began broadcasting in July 1992.

Yorkshire Coast Radio was launched on Sunday 7 November 1993, broadcasting local programming from 6 am-10 pm each day with overnight output simulcast from Minster FM. Originally, the station had planned to broadcast from the Heatherleigh, a trawler moored in Scarborough's harbour which later became a museum. When the station was brought, YCR opted for conventional studios at Falsgrave Road near the town centre, before later moving to purpose-built facilities in Eastfield, on the outskirts of town.

On 7 November 1999, Yorkshire Coast Radio expanded after its owners were awarded the licence to cover the neighbouring Bridlington area. The station operated as a part-time opt-out of Yorkshire Coast Radio and was called Yorkshire Coast Radio Bridlington.

Yorkshire Coast Radio broadcast to Scarborough and Filey on 96.2 FM, Bridlington on 102.4 FM and Whitby on 103.1 FM

On 17 February 2015, Yorkshire Coast Radio launched a DAB simulcast on the MuxCo North Yorkshire multiplex.

For a number of years the station also operated an online service called 'Yorkshire Coast Radio Extra' which broadcast news and interviews as well as football commentaries on Scarborough Athletic, Bridlington Town and Whitby Town games.

In 2018 the station launched an additional service Yorkshire Coast Radio 70s.

In September 2020, the local branding and programming was replaced with the Greatest Hits radio network.

Former notable presenters on the station include Joel Ross (later one half of JK and Joel).

Tom Hooper presented the final programme from Scarborough for Yorkshire Coast Radio on 30 August 2020.

The last of the former Yorkshire Coast Radio presenters Paddy Billington, Kev Roberts, Tom Hooper, Mike Nicholson, Tom Ironside and Matthew Pells are currently on the radio station This is The Coast which is online and on DAB.

Programming
All of Yorkshire Coast Radio's programming was produced and broadcast from its Scarborough studios. Presenter-led programming aired from 6 am–10 pm on weekdays, 6 am–6 pm on Saturdays and 8 am–4 pm on Sunday.

In the official RAJAR audience data for Q2 2018, Yorkshire Coast Radio achieved a 53% weekly reach which is higher than for any other radio station in the UK.

News
Yorkshire Coast Radio broadcast hourly local news bulletins from 6 am–10 pm on weekdays and 8 am–12 pm at weekends, with headlines on the half-hour during weekday breakfast.

Its journalists were based at the radio station's Scarborough studios and also produced content for the station's website and smartphone app.

National bulletins from Sky News Radio were carried every hour at all other times.

References

External links
 
 Muxco North Yorkshire

Yorkshire
Bauer Radio
Scarborough, North Yorkshire
Radio stations established in 1993
Mass media in Yorkshire
Bridlington
Filey
Whitby